The  Detroit Lions season was the franchise's 75th season in the National Football League.

The team began attempting to improve on their 5–11 record from 2003, they improved to 6–10 that season but, the Lions couldn't make the playoffs for a sixth consecutive season. In week 1, the Lions defeated the Chicago Bears in Chicago, 20–16, to snap a 24-game road losing streak, which was the longest road losing streak in franchise history. It was the first road win for the Lions under Matt Millen. The Lions would defeat the Houston Texans the next week, 28–16, to start the season 2–0. In week 7, the Lions defeated the New York Giants 28–13 on the road to begin the season 4–2, while going 3–0 on the road during that span. 

However, in the following weeks, the Lions played poorly, as they would lose 5 straight games to sit at 4–7. The Lions would then defeat the Arizona Cardinals 26–12 the following week. However, the week after that, the Lions were eliminated from the playoffs after they lost to the Packers 16–13 in Green Bay. The Lions would only win 1 more game the rest of the season, as they defeated the Bears in week 16, 19–13 at home. The Lions sweep over the Bears during the season would be one of 2 times during the Matt Millen era that saw the Lions sweep a divisional opponent. They also did this against the Bears in 2007. The Lions had a non-last place finish in the NFC North for the first time since the division was founded.

Offseason
During the offseason, the Lions signed former New England Patriots guard Damien Woody and former Jacksonville Jaguars cornerback Fernando Bryant.

Draft

Staff

Final roster

Regular season

Schedule
In addition to their regular games with NFC North divisional rivals, the Lions played teams from the NFC East and AFC South according to the NFL's schedule rotation, and also played games against the Atlanta Falcons and the Arizona Cardinals, who had finished fourth in their respective divisions in 2003.

Game summaries

Week 1

Standings

References

External links
 2004 Detroit Lions at Pro-Football-Reference.com

Detroit
Detroit Lions seasons
Detroit Lions